In 1954 Billboard magazine published three charts covering the best-performing country music songs in the United States: Most Played in Juke Boxes, National Best Sellers (renamed Best Sellers in Stores with the February 20 issue of the magazine), and Most Played By Jockeys.  The three charts had been published since 1944, 1948 and 1949 respectively.  The juke box chart would be discontinued in 1957 and the other two charts merged in 1958 to form a multimetric chart, which has been published weekly since that date and since 2005 has been entitled Hot Country Songs.

The number one position on all three charts was dominated in 1954 by singer Webb Pierce, who had inherited the mantle of the most popular act in country music since the death of Hank Williams in 1953 and who was in the midst of a run of success which included 12 chart-toppers in a four-year period.  On the best sellers chart, Pierce's singles "There Stands the Glass", "Slowly" and "More and More" spent a combined total of 32 weeks in the top spot, and he held the top spot from the start of the year until mid-June without interruption.  On the juke box chart, the same three songs spent 29 weeks at number one, or 30 if the chart dated March 6 is counted twice, as in that week "There Stands the Glass" and "Slowly" tied for the top spot.  On the jockeys chart, Pierce spent a total of 29 weeks at number one with four songs, including "Even Tho", which did not reach the top of the other two listings.  "More and More" was the year's final number one on all three charts.  "Slowly" was the first country chart-topper to feature the pedal steel guitar, an instrument which would go on to become a staple of the genre.

The longest-running number one song of the year on all three charts was Hank Snow's "I Don't Hurt Anymore".  The Canadian singer spent twenty consecutive weeks atop the best sellers chart with the song, the only chart-topper of the year on that listing not to be by Pierce.  This set a new record for the longest unbroken run at number one on any of Billboards country charts, although it fell one week short of the record for the highest cumulative total number of weeks at number one by a song, which Snow himself held jointly with Eddy Arnold.  "I Don't Hurt Anymore" also spent twenty non-consecutive weeks at number one on the juke box chart, and a total of eighteen weeks in the top spot on the jockeys listing.  One act achieved a debut country number one in 1954.  Johnnie & Jack spent two weeks in the top spot of the jockeys chart with "(Oh Baby Mine) I Get So Lonely", the only number one for the duo.  Six weeks after Johnnie Wright, one half of Johnnie & Jack, spent his final week at number one, his wife Kitty Wells reached the top spot with "One by One", a duet with Red Foley.  She was the only female artist to top the chart in 1954.  "One by One" was the final chart-topper for Foley, who had achieved his first number one ten years earlier and had been among the most prolific acts in the first decade of Billboards country music charts, with more than 50 entries.

Chart history

a.  Two songs tied for number one on the jockeys chart.
b.  Two songs tied for number one on the juke box chart.

See also
1954 in country music
List of artists who reached number one on the U.S. country chart

References

1954
Country
1954 record charts